This is a list of notable alumni that have graduated from Clemson University.

Arts, entertainment, and media
Harry Ashmore, journalist, received Pulitzer Prize for Public Service in 1958 
Lee Brice, country music singer
Aaron Buerge, The Bachelor, Season 2
Daja Dial, Miss South Carolina 2015
James Dickey, writer and poet with American South influences (attended for one year, but did not graduate from Clemson)
Jonathan Hickman, comic book writer and artist
Rob Huebel, actor/comedian, Human Giant
Fiona Hutchison, One Life to Live actress
Matt William Knowles, actor, Asura.
Connie LeGrand, former co-host of Speed Channel's Speed News (now The Speed Report)
Chris Luca, winner of Amazing Race 2
Nancy O'Dell, former Miss South Carolina and host of Entertainment Tonight
Jane Robelot, CBS National news anchor
Ben Robertson, 1923, World War II correspondent, author
Ali Rogers, 2014, former Miss South Carolina, 1st runner-up at Miss America 2013
 Mark Tremonti, lead guitarist for "Creed" and "Alter Bridge" and his own band "Tremonti"; named Guitarist of the Year three consecutive years by Guitar World, multiple Grammy Awards (did not graduate, attended Clemson his freshman year)  
James Michael Tyler, actor, played Gunther on Friends
Shawn Weatherly, Miss Universe, 1980–81

Business and industry
Robert H. Brooks, founder and chairman of Naturally Fresh Dressings, Sauces and Dips; president of Atlanta-based Hooters of America, Inc; the Brooks Center for the Performing Arts is named for his son Mark, who died in the same plane crash as NASCAR driver Alan Kulwicki
Aaron Buerge, banker
Charlene Corley, former defense contractor who was convicted in 2007 on two counts of conspiracy
Richard C. Davis, founder of Trademark Properties, appeared in the first season of A&E's Flip This House
Gary Parsons, Chairman of the Board and former President and CEO of XM Satellite Radio
Jamey Rootes, President of the Houston Texans and former President of Columbus Crew of the MLS
George H. Ross, executive vice president and senior counsel of the Trump Organization; advisor to Donald Trump on the NBC reality television program The Apprentice
Paul Steelman, architect known for designing casinos and entertainment venues, including the Sands Macao
Mohnish Pabrai is an Indian-American businessman, investor, and philanthropist.
Jeffrey J. Brown is the CEO and Board of Directors of Ally Financial
Ted Holt, well known auto dealer and stadium announcer for the Cook County Hornets

Academia 

Autar Kaw, Professor at University of South Florida, 2012 U.S. Professor of the Year (administered by CASE and Carnegie Foundation for the Advancement of Teaching)

Government and politics 

David Beasley, Governor of South Carolina (1995–1999) 
Alfred W. Bethea (Class of 1938), former member of the South Carolina House of Representatives, the 1970 American Independent Party nominee for governor of South Carolina
Charlie Blackwell-Thompson, NASA Launch Director 
James F. Byrnes, former U. S. Secretary of State (1945–1947), former U.S. Senator (1931–1941), former Associate Justice of the Supreme Court of the United States (1941–1942)
West Cox, member of the South Carolina House of Representatives
Eddie Doucet, former member of the Louisiana House of Representatives 
Jeff Duncan, U.S. Representative for South Carolina's 3rd congressional district
Ekwee Ethuro, Speaker of the Kenyan Senate
Harvey Gantt, former mayor of Charlotte and first African-American graduate of Clemson University
Nikki Haley, U.S. Permanent Representative to the United Nations, former Governor of South Carolina 
Mark Hammond, South Carolina Secretary of State
Kristie A. Kenney, United States Ambassador to the Royal Kingdom of Thailand, 2010 to date
Earle Morris, Jr., former Lt. Governor, Comptroller General of South Carolina
Bob Peeler, South Carolina lieutenant governor (1995–2003)
Harvey S. Peeler, Jr., Republican member of the South Carolina Senate since 1980
Strom Thurmond, former Governor of South Carolina, former U.S. Senator 
David Wilkins, former Speaker of South Carolina House, former U.S. Ambassador to Canada, current Chairman of the Clemson University Board of Trustees
 Jaw Shaw-kong, former Member of the Legislative Yuan of Taiwan, founder of Taiwan's New Party

Military
Rudolf Anderson Jr., major in the United States Air Force, the only combat casualty of the Cuban Missile Crisis when his U-2 spy plane was shot down
Aquilla J. Dyess, United States Marine Corps Lieutenant Colonel, Medal of Honor recipient, killed in action in World War II, only American to receive both the Carnegie Medal for civilian heroism and the Medal of Honor
Gary Evans Foster, United States Army (South Carolina National Guard) Sergeant, Medal of Honor recipient in World War I
John W. Raymond, United States Air Force General & 1st Chief of Space Operations, United States Space Force 
Daniel Augustus Joseph Sullivan, United States Navy Ensign, Medal of Honor recipient in World War I

Sports

Baseball
Jeff Baker, Texas Rangers utility player
Kris Benson, former MLB pitcher, 1996 Dick Howser Trophy winner
Ty Cline, former MLB outfielder and first baseman with several teams
Tyler Colvin, San Francisco Giants outfielder
 Steven Duggar (born 1993), outfielder for the San Francisco Giants
Khalil Greene, former MLB infielder with the San Diego Padres and St. Louis Cardinals, 2002 Golden Spikes Award winner
Steven Jackson, Pittsburgh Pirates relief pitcher
Jimmy Key, former MLB pitcher with Toronto Blue Jays, New York Yankees, and Baltimore Orioles, four-time All-Star, two-time World Series Champion
Brian Kowitz, former MLB outfielder with the Atlanta Braves
Tyler Krieger, second baseman in the Cleveland Indians organization
Matthew LeCroy, former MLB infielder
Billy McMillon, former MLB outfielder with the Florida Marlins (1996–1997), Philadelphia Phillies (1997), Detroit Tigers (2000–2001) and Oakland Athletics (2001, 2003–2004); current Manager of the Salem Red Sox of the Class A Carolina League, an affiliate of the Boston Red Sox; Member of Clemson Hall of Fame, 2012
 Brad Miller, Philadelphia Phillies infielder
Kyle Parker, outfielder, Colorado Rockies; also played football at Clemson
Danny Sheaffer, former MLB catcher/third baseman
Bill Spiers, former MLB infielder with the Milwaukee Brewers, New York Mets, and Houston Astros
Tim Teufel, former MLB second baseman, 1986 World Series Champion, current third base coach with the New York Mets

Basketball

Jaron Blossomgame, NBA player for the San Antonio Spurs, basketball player in the Israeli Basketball Premier League
Trevor Booker, current NBA forward for the Brooklyn Nets, drafted 23rd overall in the 2010 NBA Draft
Greg Buckner, former NBA guard
Elden Campbell, former NBA forward/center, drafted 27th overall in the 1990 NBA Draft
Dale Davis, former NBA forward/center, All-Star (2000), drafted 13th overall in the 1991 NBA Draft
Horace Grant, former NBA forward, All-Star (1994), four-time NBA Champion, ACC Player of the Year (1987), drafted 10th overall in the 1987 NBA Draft
Cliff Hammonds, current guard for s.Oliver Würzburg
Randolph Mahaffey, former NBA guard, All-Star (1968)
K.J. McDaniels, current NBA forward for the Houston Rockets, first team All-ACC and ACC Defensive Player of the Year (2014), drafted 32nd overall in the 2014 NBA Draft
Larry Nance, former NBA forward, three-time NBA All-Star (1985, 1989, 1993), first winner of NBA "slam dunk" competition (1984), NBA All-Defense First Team (1989), drafted 20th overall in the 1981 NBA Draft
Wayne "Tree" Rollins, former NBA player and executive, NBA All-Defense First Team (1984), drafted 14th overall in the 1977 NBA Draft
 Will Solomon (born 1978), basketball player
 Elijah Thomas (born 1996), basketball player for Bnei Herzliya in the Israeli Basketball Premier League
Itoro Umoh-Coleman, former WNBA player
Chris Whitney, former NBA guard
Sharone Wright, former NBA forward/center, drafted sixth overall in the 1994 NBA Draft

Football
Players in the 2014 National Football League season; years played at Clemson are in parentheses:

Dwayne Allen (2009–2011), tight end for the Indianapolis Colts
Da'Quan Bowers (2008–2010), defensive end 
Andre Branch (2008–2011), defensive end for the Jacksonville Jaguars
Bashaud Breeland (2011–2013), cornerback for the Washington Redskins
Jaron Brown (2009–2012), wide receiver for the Arizona Cardinals
Martavis Bryant (2011–2013), wide receiver for the Pittsburgh Steelers
Chandler Catanzaro (2010–2013), kicker for the Arizona Cardinals
Kavell Conner (2006–2009), linebacker for the San Diego Chargers
Andre Ellington (2009–2012), running back for the Arizona Cardinals
Dalton Freeman (2009–2012), center for the New York Jets
Marcus Gilchrist (2007–2010), defensive back for the Oakland Raiders
Malliciah Goodman (2009–2012), defensive end for the Atlanta Falcons
Chris Hairston (2007–2010), offensive lineman for the San Diego Chargers
DeAndre Hopkins (2010–2012), wide receiver for the Arizona Cardinals
Adam Humphries (2011-2015), wide receiver for the Tampa Bay Buccaneers
Jarvis Jenkins (2007–2010), defensive tackle for the Chicago Bears
Trevor Lawrence (2018–2020), quarterback for the Jacksonville Jaguars
Byron Maxwell (2007–2010), cornerback for the Philadelphia Eagles
Antoine McClain (2009–2012), offensive lineman for the Arizona Cardinals
Jonathan Meeks (2009–2012), safety for the Buffalo Bills
Michael Palmer (2006–2009), tight end for the Pittsburgh Steelers
Artavis Scott, wide receiver for the Los Angeles Chargers
Coty Sensabaugh (2008–2011), cornerback for the Tennessee Titans
Tyler Shatley (2010–2013), offensive guard for the Jacksonville Jaguars
C. J. Spiller (2006–2009), running back for the New Orleans Saints, unanimous first-team All-American (2009), ACC Player of the Year (2009), drafted ninth overall in the 2010 NFL Draft, Pro Bowl (2012)
Brandon Thomas (2010–2013), offensive tackle for the San Francisco 49ers
Brandon Thompson (2008–2011), defensive tackle for the Cincinnati Bengals
Sammy Watkins (2011–2013), wide receiver for the Buffalo Bills, drafted fourth overall in the 2014 NFL Draft
Charlie Whitehurst (2002–2005), quarterback for the Tennessee Titans, previously with the San Diego Chargers and Seattle Seahawks 
Deshaun Watson (2014-2016), quarterback for the Houston Texans, drafted 12th overall in the 2017 NFL Draft
Mike Williams, wide receiver for the Los Angeles Chargers, drafted 7th in the 2017 NFL Draft

Former players of note:
Gaines Adams, former NFL defensive end for the Tampa Bay Buccaneers and the Chicago Bears, drafted fourth overall in the 2007 NFL Draft
Keith Adams, former NFL linebacker, two-time NCAA first-team All-American (1999, 2000)
Terry Allen, former NFL running back, #20 All-time leading rusher in NFL history
Obed Ariri, former NFL placekicker, NCAA first-team All-American (1980)
Thomas Austin
Jeff Bostic, former Washington Redskins center, only player in Clemson history to be a three-time Super Bowl Champion
Tajh Boyd, quarterback, 2012 ACC Player of the Year, two-time first-team All-ACC (2011, 2012), school records for passing yards (11,904) and passing touchdowns (107)
Brentson Buckner, former NFL defensive tackle
Jim Bundren, former NFL player
Jerry Butler, former Buffalo Bills wide receiver, currently Director of Player Development for the Cleveland Browns
Dwight Clark, former San Francisco 49ers wide receiver, two-time Pro Bowler, two-time All-Pro, two-time Super Bowl Champion
Fred Cone, former NFL fullback and kicker for the Green Bay Packers and the Dallas Cowboys
Airese Currie, former Chicago Bears wide receiver
Woodrow Dantzler, former NFL running back for the Dallas Cowboys and the Atlanta Falcons, played quarterback at Clemson
Billy Davis, linebacker/DB for the St. Louis Cardinals
James Davis, former running back for the Cleveland Browns
Jeff Davis, former NFL Linebacker, NCAA first-team All-American (1981)
Brian Dawkins, former NFL defensive back for the Philadelphia Eagles and the Denver Broncos, nine-time Pro Bowler, six-time All-Pro, Pro Football Hall of Famer
Mike Dukes, former AFL linebacker, twoAll-Star (1960), two-time AFL Champion (1960–61)
Antuan Edwards, former NFL cornerback/safety
John Edwards, played for one year before transferring to NC State; former Democratic Senator from North Carolina; 2004 vice presidential nominee
Terrence Flagler, former NFL running back, first team All-American (1986)
Kenny Flowers, former NFL running back
Jacoby Ford, former NFL wide receiver with the Oakland Raiders
Steve Fuller, former NFL quarterback for the Kansas City Chiefs, Los Angeles Rams, and Chicago Bears
Rod Gardner, former NFL wide receiver
Chris Gardocki, former NFL punter, Pro Bowler and All-Pro (1996) 
Dale Hatcher, former NFL punter, Pro Bowler and All-Pro (1985) 
Larry Hefner, former Green Bay Packers linebacker
Leroy Hill, former Seattle Seahawks linebacker
Tye Hill, former NFL cornerback, NCAA first-team All-American (2005)
Bill Hudson, former AFL defensive tackle, All-Star (1961)
Donald Igwebuike, former NFL placekicker
Steven Jackson, former Carolina Panthers fullback
Bobby Johnson, former Vanderbilt University head football coach
John Johnson, NFL player
Terry Kinard, former NFL defensive back, Pro Bowler (1988), two-time NCAA first-team All-American
Levon Kirkland, former NFL linebacker, two-time Pro Bowler (1996–97), 1991 NCAA first-team All-American
John Leake, former NFL linebacker
Kevin Mack, former Cleveland Browns running back, two-time Pro Bowler (1985, 1987)
Ray Mathews, former NFL wide receiver, two-time Pro Bowler
Ed McDaniel, former NFL linebacker, Pro Bowler (1998), 1991 NCAA first-team All-American
Banks McFadden, first same-season two-sport All-American in 1939 (football, basketball); 1939 Nation's Most Versatile Athlete, drafted 4th overall in the 1940 NFL Draft by the Brooklyn Dodgers; 1940 NFL yards per carry leader; Clemson Ring-of-Honor; Voted Clemson's All-Time Greatest Athlete
Chester McGlockton, former NFL defensive lineman, four-time Pro Bowler (1994–97)
Phillip Merling, former NFL defensive end
Justin Miller, former NFL cornerback, Pro Bowler (2006), All-Pro (2006)
Harold Olson, former AFL tackle, All-Star (1961), All-Pro (1962) 
Michael Dean Perry, former NFL defensive lineman, six-time Pro Bowler (1989–91, 93–94, 96), AFC Defensive Player of the Year (1989), NCAA first-team All-American (1987)
William "Refrigerator" Perry, former NFL defensive lineman, Super Bowl XX Champion, three-time NCAA All-American (1982–1984)
Trevor Pryce, former NFL defensive lineman, two-time Super Bowl Champion, three-time All-Pro, four-time Pro Bowler
Johnny Rembert, former NFL linebacker, two-time Pro Bowler (1989, 1990)
Ashley Sheppard, former NFL linebacker
Anthony Simmons, football player
Wayne Simmons, former NFL Linebacker, Super Bowl XXXI Champion
Jim Speros, former linebacker, Super Bowl-winning assistant coach; youngest assistant coach in NFL history
Chansi Stuckey, former wide receiver for the New York Jets
Jim Stuckey, former NFL defensive tackle for the San Francisco 49ers, two-time Super Bowl Champion
David Treadwell, former NFL placekicker, NCAA first-team All-American (1987)
Perry Tuttle, former NFL wider receiver, NCAA first-team All-American (1981)
Charlie Waters, former Dallas Cowboys safety, two-time All-Pro (1977–78), three-time Pro Bowler (1976–78)
Joel Wells, former NFL halfback
Donnell Woolford, former NFL defensive back, Pro Bowler 1993, two-time NCAA first-team All-American (1987, 1988)

Golf
Jonathan Byrd, PGA Tour golfer, five-time Tour winner
Lucas Glover, PGA Tour golfer, 2009 U.S. Open champion, three-time Tour winner
Matt Hendrix, PGA Tour golfer
Kevin Johnson, PGA Tour golfer, six-time Nationwide Tour winner
Ben Martin, PGA Tour golfer, U.S. Amateur runner-up in 2009
Chris Patton, 1989 U.S. Amateur champion
Clarence Rose, former PGA Tour golfer, winner of 1996 Sprint International
Sam Saunders, PGA Tour golfer
Kyle Stanley, PGA Tour golfer, winner of 2012 Waste Management Phoenix Open
D. J. Trahan, PGA Tour golfer, winner of 2006 Southern Farm Bureau Classic and 2008 Bob Hope Chrysler Classic
Charles Warren, PGA Tour golfer, winner of 1997 NCAA Championship

Soccer
Greg Eckhardt, professional soccer player
Stuart Holden, Bolton Wanderers and US National Team soccer player, midfielder
Oguchi Onyewu, A.C. Milan and US National Team soccer player, defender
Dane Richards, N.Y. Red Bulls MLS player
Kailen Sheridan, goalkeeper for Sky Blue FC and Canada women's national soccer team; bronze medalist at Rio 2016

Tennis
Jay Berger, professional tennis player ranked as high as # 7 in the world
Julie Coin, French tennis player
Gigi Fernández, former women's tennis player; won 17 Grand Slam doubles titles and two Olympic gold medals; ranked the World No. 1 women's doubles player

Track and field
Carlton Chambers, 1996 Olympic gold medalist in the 4x100 metres relay
Shawn Crawford, 2004 Olympic gold and silver medalist in track and field; 2008 Olympic silver medalist in track and field
Kim Graham, 1996 Olympic gold medalist in the 4x400 metres relay
Michael Green, Jamaican-born sprinter, made the men's 100 m final at the 1996 Summer Olympics in Atlanta
Brianna Rollins, 2016 Olympic gold medalist in the 100 meter hurdles

Wrestling
Sammie Henson, 1993 and 1994 NCAA wrestling champion, 2000 Olympic silver medalist and 1998 world champion in freestyle wrestling
Noel Loban, 1980 NCAA wrestling champion, 1984 Olympic bronze medalist in freestyle wrestling

Other sports
Chris Eatough, professional marathon mountain bike racer, played soccer while attending Clemson
Greg Erwin, competition director for Team Penske in NASCAR Nationwide Series, former crew chief
Mitzi Kremer, 1998 Olympic bronze medalist in swimming

References

Clemson University alumni